The Technical Ecstasy Tour was a concert tour by English heavy metal band Black Sabbath. It began on 22 October 1976 and ended on 22 April 1977.

Overview

Background

North America leg
Having toned down the band's 'black magic' image for Technical Ecstasy, Geezer Butler assured Circus, "Parents can take their kids to our shows now." Opening acts included Ted Nugent and, promoting their Next album, Journey.

Europe leg
A notorious encounter occurred between Geezer Butler and Malcolm Young of support band AC/DC when the tour reached Europe. "Flick-knives were banned in England," Butler recalled, "but, when we were playing in Switzerland, I bought one. I was just flicking it, when Malcolm Young came up to me and started slagging Sabbath… He came over and said, 'You must think you're big, having a flick-knife.' I said, 'What are you talking about?' And that was it. Nobody got hurt."

AC/DC's support slot had, in any case, begun inauspiciously. "All the gear was blowing up," reported Angus Young of their first show, in Paris. "We played about twenty minutes then destroyed the stage."

Setlist

Songs played overall
"Supertzar" [Audio Introduction]
"Symptom of the Universe"
"Snowblind"
"All Moving Parts Stand Still"
"War Pigs"
"Gypsy"
"Megalomania"
"Black Sabbath"
"Dirty Women"
Bill Ward drum solo
Instrumental band jam
Tony Iommi guitar solo
"Rock 'N' Roll Doctor"
"Electric Funeral"
"Bassically" Geezer Butler bass solo
"N.I.B."
"Iron Man"
"Fairies Wear Boots"
"Embryo" and "Children of the Grave"
Encore
"Supernaut" [Intro] and "Paranoid"

Typical setlist
"Supertzar" [Audio Introduction]
"Symptom of the Universe"
"Snowblind"
"All Moving Parts Stand Still"
"War Pigs"
"Gypsy"
"Black Sabbath"
"Dirty Women"
Bill Ward drum solo
Instrumental band jam
Tony Iommi guitar solo
"Rock 'N' Roll Doctor"
"Electric Funeral"
"Bassically" [Geezer Butler bass solo]
"N.I.B."
"Iron Man"
"Embryo" and "Children of the Grave"
Encore
"Supernaut" [Intro] and "Paranoid"

Tour dates

Box office score data

Personnel
 Ozzy Osbourne – vocals
 Tony Iommi – guitar
 Geezer Butler — bass
 Bill Ward – drums
 Gerald Woodroffe – keyboards

References

Black Sabbath concert tours
1976 concert tours
1977 concert tours